Leo Jaworowski (born as Ludwik Jaworowski; ; 1764 – 2 November 1833) was a bishop of the Ruthenian Uniate Church served administrator for Suprasl Eparchy.

In 1806-07 as a priest Leo Jaworowski served as administrator of Suprasl Eparchy.

On 27 January 1811 he was consecrated as a titular bishop of Wlodzimierz and Bresc by bishops Gregory Kochanowicz, John Krasowski, Josaphat Bulhak and Adrian Holownia.

In 1825 Jaworowski assisted in consecration of bishop Cyril Syrotinski.

See also
 Supraśl Orthodox Monastery

References

External links
 Leo Jaworowski at the catholic-hierarchy.org

1764 births
1833 deaths
People from Białystok
People from Podlaskie Voivodeship
Bishops of the Uniate Church of the Polish–Lithuanian Commonwealth